The first elections to the Haryana Legislative Assembly were held in February 1967 to elect members of 81 constituencies in Haryana, India. The Indian National Congress won the popular vote and a majority of seats and Birender Singh was appointed as the Chief Minister of Haryana.

Results

Elected members

See also
List of constituencies of the Haryana Legislative Assembly
1967 elections in India

References 

State Assembly elections in Haryana
Haryana
1960s in Haryana